Brendon Gooneratne (born 28 March 1938) is a Sri Lankan scholar and physician.

Educated at Royal College Colombo, Gooneratne gained his MBBS (Hons) from the University of Ceylon, Colombo and went on to gain a DAPE from the London School of Hygiene & Tropical Medicine and a PhD from the University of London. He was the first Sri Lankan Doctor to be awarded the Beit Memorial Fellowship for Medical Research.

In a legendary Royal-Thomian match, in 1954, he took 4 wickets for 15 runs and top scored in the match. In 1956, in Wesley College, Colombo, he took 8 wickets for 18 runs, in a match which was thereafter colloquially known as ‘Brendon Gooneratne’s Match’.

Brendon Gooneratne was a Chairman of the Sri Lankan branch of the international Pugwash group, and Chairman of The Friends Of The Ancient Cities.

References

External links
Brendon Gooneratne - information and articles

1938 births
Academic staff of the University of Ceylon (Peradeniya)
Alumni of the London School of Hygiene & Tropical Medicine
Alumni of Royal College, Colombo
Alumni of the University of Ceylon (Colombo)
Alumni of the University of London
Living people
Sinhalese writers
Sinhalese academics
Sinhalese physicians